Barnea is a genus of bivalves belonging to the family Pholadidae.

The genus has cosmopolitan distribution.

Species

Barnea alfredensis 
Barnea australasiae 
Barnea birmanica 
Barnea candida  
Barnea davidi 
Barnea dilatata 
Barnea fragilis 
arnea ghanaensis 
Barnea japonica 
Barnea lamellosa 
Barnea manilensis 
Barnea obturamentum 
Barnea parva 
Barnea similis 
Barnea subtruncata 
Barnea truncata

References

Pholadidae
Bivalve genera